The Sony NEX-6 is a digital camera announced at 12 September 2012. It is a mirrorless interchangeable lens camera or MILC, and this has a smaller body form factor than a traditional DSLR, whilst retaining the sensor size and features of an APS-C-sized model. It is targeted at experienced users, enthusiasts and professionals. It is replaced by the α6000.

References

NEX-6
NEX-6
Live-preview digital cameras